"Where's the beef?" is a catchphrase in the United States and Canada, introduced as a slogan for the fast food chain Wendy's in 1984. Since then it has become an all-purpose phrase questioning the substance of an idea, event, or product.

History

The phrase first came to the public audience in a U.S. television commercial  for the Wendy's chain of hamburger restaurants in 1984. The strategy behind the campaign was to distinguish competitors' (McDonald's and Burger King) big name hamburgers (Big Mac and Whopper respectively) from Wendy's "modest" Single by focusing on the large bun used by the competitors and the larger beef patty in Wendy's hamburger.  In the ad, titled "Fluffy Bun", actress Clara Peller receives a burger with a massive bun but a tiny patty from a fictional competitor, which uses the slogan "Home of the Big Bun". The small patty prompts Peller angrily to exclaim, "Where's the beef?" Director Joe Sedelmaier actually wanted Peller to say, "Where is all the beef?" but because of emphysema, that was too hard for her. 

The commercial was originally supposed to star a young couple, but Sedelmaier did not find the concept funny and changed it to the elderly ladies.

An earlier version, featuring a middle-aged bald man saying, "Thanks, but where's the beef?", failed to make much impact. After the Peller version, the catchphrase was repeated in television shows, films, magazines, and other media outlets.

First airing in 1984, the original commercial featured three elderly ladies at the "Home of the Big Bun" examining an exaggeratedly large hamburger bun. The other two ladies poke at it, exchanging bemused comments ("It certainly is a big bun. It's a very big bun. It's a big fluffy bun. It's a very big fluffy—"). As one of the ladies lifts the top half of the bun, a comically minuscule hamburger patty with cheese and a pickle is revealed (prompting her to finish the sentence "—bun." with a much more disappointed tone). Peller immediately responds with her outraged, irascible question.

Sequels featured Peller yelling at a Fluffy Bun executive from his yacht over the phone and approaching fast food drive-up windows (including the "Home of the Big Bun" and a restaurant with a golden arch) that were slammed down before she could complete the line.

Later in 1984, Nashville songwriter and DJ Coyote McCloud wrote and performed a hit song entitled "Where's the Beef?" as a promotion for Wendy's restaurants' famous advertising campaign featuring Clara Peller.

The advertising campaign ended in 1985 after Peller performed in a commercial for Prego pasta sauce, saying "I found it, I really found it", a phrase alluding to the beef in the listener's mind.

There were many "Where's the beef?" promotional items, including bumper stickers, frisbees, clothing patches, a Milton Bradley game, and more.

In 2011, Wendy's revived the phrase for its new ad campaign, finally answering its own question with "Here's the beef".

During the 2020 COVID-19 pandemic, when stores were experiencing a shortage of beef, Wendy's revived the ad. 

To launch their new breakfast menu in Canada, Wendy’s released a new advertisement campaign called “Where’s the Bacon?” as a callback to the “Where’s the Beef?”. The new campaign is similar to its older counterpart, except it focuses on the amount of bacon in breakfast sandwiches rather than beef size. 

For the 2023 Daytona 500, Legacy Motor Club driver Noah Gragson, sponsored by Wendy's, uses the No. 42 Chevrolet Camaro carrying "The Beef" on the hood, and a video released by the team featured Gragson using the phrase in the promotional video.

Credits
William Welter, the executive vice president of Wendy's International, led the marketing team at the time of the campaign. The commercial was directed by Joe Sedelmaier as part of a campaign by the advertising agency Dancer Fitzgerald Sample. It was written by Cliff Freeman. The marketing  and promotion campaign were created by Alan Hilburg and the Burson-Marsteller team under the direction of Denny Lynch, the vice president of corporate communications at Wendy's.

Gary Hart and Walter Mondale
The phrase became associated with the 1984 U.S. presidential election. During primaries in the spring of 1984, when the commercial was at its height of popularity, Democratic candidate and former Vice President Walter Mondale used the phrase to sum up his arguments that program policies championed by his rival, Senator Gary Hart, were insubstantial, beginning with a March 11, 1984, televised debate at the Fox Theatre in Atlanta prior to the New York and Pennsylvania primaries.

Hart had moved his candidacy from dark horse to the lead over Mondale based on allegedly superficial similarities to John F. Kennedy, and his repeated use of the phrase "new ideas". When Hart once again used the slogan in the debate, Mondale leaned forward and said, "When I hear your new ideas, I'm reminded of that ad, 'Where's the beef? Subsequently, the two campaigns continually clashed using the two dueling slogans, Hart frequently showing reams of policy papers and retorting "Here's the beef."  Mondale's strategy succeeded in casting doubt on Hart's new ideas, and changing the debate to specific details, earning him the Democratic presidential nomination.

See also

References

1980s fads and trends
1984 neologisms
American advertising slogans
American political catchphrases
American television commercials
Democratic Party presidential debates
Snowclones
Wendy's International